Michael Perlak (born 26 December 1985) is an Austrian footballer who plays as a midfielder for SC Wiener Neustadt.

Honours 
SV Mattersburg
Winner
 Austrian Football First League: 2014–15

Notes

References

External links 
 Profile at Bundesliga.at
 Michael Perlak at ÖFB

1985 births
Living people
Association football midfielders
Austrian footballers
SV Grödig players
USK Anif players
SV Austria Salzburg players
SV Mattersburg players
SC Wiener Neustadt players
Austrian Football Bundesliga players
2. Liga (Austria) players
Austrian Regionalliga players